Shah Ali Baghdadi Mazar Sharif is a shrine in Mirpur Model Thana, Amin Bazar, Bangladesh.

References

Dhaka